María Fátima Báñez García (born 6 January 1967), better known as Fátima Báñez, is a Spanish politician, economist and jurist. She was Minister of Employment and Social Security from December 2011 until June 2018, when a vote of no-confidence against Mariano Rajoy ousted the government.

Education
Báñez holds a degree in Law and in Economics and Business Studies from the Comillas Pontifical University (ICADE). She served as a councillor of the Andalusia Radio and Television (1997-2000).

Career
Báñez was a member of the Spanish Parliament during the seventh, the eighth, the ninth and the tenth terms, representing Huelva Province. In this capacity, she held the following positions:

 Economy and Finance Commission, Member of the Board
 Committee on Budgets, Spokeswoman
 Industry, Tourism and Trade Commission, Member of the Board
 Spanish delegation of the Parliamentary Group of Friendship with the House of Representatives of Japan, Member of the Board
 Presidency coordinator of the People's Party in Andalusia

Minister of Employment 
On 22 December 2011, Mariano Rajoy appointed her Minister of Employment and Social Security, replacing Valeriano Gómez
Unemployment at that time was the most serious problem for Spaniards, according to the Spanish Center for Sociological Research. The number of unemployed in Spain stood at 5,273,600; the number of households in which all their active members was unemployed stood at 1,575,000; the unemployment rate was 22.85%, double the average EU rate; the youth unemployment rate was closer to 50%; 1.2 million jobs had been lost since the fourth quarter of 2007; the percentage of the work force regarded as temporary workers was at 25%, one of the highest in the EU.
On Friday 10 February 2012, she launched the first labour reform of the PP government. This measure gained
the support of the European Commission, the Bank of Spain and the  OCDE, but it couldn't get the approval of the trade unions. Although Báñez was open to dialogue, she confirmed that the basic lines of the reform would remain unchanged. The most criticized point was that of making dismissal less costly, because the compensation for unfair dismissal for indefinite duration contracts was reduced from 45 to 33 days per year worked, while the compensation in the case of objective dismissals, was set at 20 days per year worked. Redundancy compensation for workers in Spain was traditionally the highest in Europe. The mobilizations against labor reform culminated on 29 March 2012, with the first general strike during the whole period of the governance of Mariano Rajoy.

On 24 January 2013, thirteen months into her post of Minister of Employment and Social Security, the number of unemployed in Spain stood at 5,965,400 and the unemployment rate was 26.02%. On 25 April 2013, according to the EPA (Spanish Labour Force Survey), the number of unemployed workers in Spain was 6,202,700 and the unemployment rate was 27.16% of the employable population. Her reforms are widely credited with helping reduce unemployment, which stood at 18.9% in later 2016, still the second highest rate in the European Union after Greece.

References

1967 births
20th-century Spanish women politicians
21st-century Spanish women politicians
Comillas Pontifical University alumni
Government ministers of Spain
Living people
Members of the 7th Congress of Deputies (Spain)
Members of the 8th Congress of Deputies (Spain)
Members of the 9th Congress of Deputies (Spain)
Members of the 10th Congress of Deputies (Spain)
Members of the 12th Congress of Deputies (Spain)
People from the Province of Huelva
People's Party (Spain) politicians
Women government ministers of Spain
Women members of the Congress of Deputies (Spain)